Granada Theater is a theater in Wilmington, Los Angeles. C.L. Post of the Post Cereal family built the Granada Theatre in 1926 as part of the West Coast Theatres chain. One year later, Fox Theatres purchased West Coast and changed the name to the Fox Granada.

The architect was W.J. MacCormack.

The Los Angeles City Council designated the theater as a historic cultural monument in 2021. 

The theatre is closed but the Wilmington Granada Friends is fundraising to reopen the theatre as a performing arts center and independent cinema.

References

External links
https://www.facebook.com/WilmingtonGranadaFriends
https://sites.google.com/site/lamoviepalaces/granada-wilmington

Cinemas and movie theaters in Los Angeles
Wilmington, Los Angeles
Public venues with a theatre organ
Theatres completed in 1926
1926 establishments in California
Los Angeles Historic-Cultural Monuments